Immunoglobulin heavy constant alpha 1 is a immunoglobulin gene with symbol IGHA1. It encodes a constant (C) segment of Immunoglobulin A heavy chain. Immunoglobulin A is an antibody that plays a critical role in immune function in the mucous membranes. IgA shows the same typical structure of other antibody classes, with two heavy chains and two light chains, and four distinct domains: one variable region, and three variable regions. As a major class of immunoglobulin in body secretions, IgA plays a role in defending against infection, as well as preventing the access of foreign antigens to the immunologic system.

Discovery 
IGHA1 was first described in detail in 1975, when the primary structure (the amino acid sequence) of IgA was elucidated through the sequencing of tryptic and chymotryptic peptides. Similarly, the primary sequence was determined independently for the alpha-2 chain of the protein in 1979. Complete nucleotide sequences for the alpha-1 heavy chain constant region and the allelic alpha-2 heavy chain regions were published in 1984, and showed the genes were contained in three exons, each of which encodes a single region of the protein domain.

Gene Location 
The genes encoding IGHA1 are found on human chromosome 14. The sequence encoding IGHA1 is 1,497 nucleotides long and is found between loci 105,707,168 and 105,708,664. The annotated chromosome location is also given as 14q32.33.

Protein Structure 
The Ig alpha-1 chain C region is contained on the first of the constant regions of IgA, and is composed of an amino acid sequence 353 residues long. The secondary structure contained within this region is dominated by beta strands, which define four antiparallel beta sheets. These antiparallel beta-sheets are then sandwiched to form two beta-sandwiches, a typical tertiary structure of the immunoglobulin fold class. The two beta sheets that comprise each beta-sandwich are joined by an alpha helix on one side. These alpha helices define the binding site for this protein, with the binding site incorporating one antiparallel beta strand on either side of the helix. In addition to the binding sites, the opposite side of the beta-sandwich is connected by a series of loops, which define a hypervariable loop system, that may have a role in determining the specificity of an interaction between IgA and an antigen.

Pathological Information 
IGHA1 has been implicated in a chromosomal abnormality identified in multiple myeloma lines. The abnormality has been identified as a translocation event, where translocation between IGHA1 (found on chromosome 14), and FCRL4 (the gene sequence encoding for an inhibitory receptor, found on chromosome 1) leads to the production of a fusion protein.

References

Further reading

 
 
 
 
 
 
 
 
 
 
 
 
 
 
 
 
 
 
 

Genes
Human proteins